Fuksa is a Czech surname. Notable people with the surname include:

Ivan Fuksa (born 1963), Czech politician
Martin Fuksa (born 1993), Czech canoeist
Petr Fuksa (born 1969), Czech canoeist
Petr Fuksa Jr. (born 1998), Czech canoeist

See also
Fūka (given name)

Czech-language surnames